Spring Lake Park is the name of some places in the United States of America:

Spring Lake Park, Minnesota, a city
Spring Lake Park (Illinois), a public park in Macomb, Illinois
Spring Lake (Omaha, Nebraska), a public park in South Omaha, Nebraska
Spring Lake Regional Park, a public park in Santa Rosa, California
Spring Lake Park (Texarkana, Texas)